Florică Murariu (28 March 1955 – 24 December 1989) was a Romanian professional rugby union flanker.

Career
Murariu spent his entire career playing for Steaua Bucharest, where he won 10 league titles.

He won 69 caps for Romania, from 1976 to 1989, and scored 8 tries, 32 points on aggregate. He made his international debut against France on 14 November 1976. He captained his country for the first time on 12 April 1986 against France. He was called for the 1987 Rugby World Cup, playing in two games and scoring 2 tries, 8 points on aggregate. His final international appearance came against England on 13 May 1989.

Murariu was an officer in the Romanian Army and was shot dead at a roadblock during the 1989 Revolution.

Honours

Club
Steaua Bucharest
Romanian League:
 Champion (10): 1977, 1979, 1980, 1981, 1983, 1984, 1985, 1987, 1988, 1989
Cupa României:
 Winner (2): 1977, 1978

International
Romania
FIRA Nations Cup:
 Winner (3): 1977, 1981, 1983

References

Further reading

External links

1955 births
1989 deaths
People from Botoșani County
Romanian rugby union players
Rugby union flankers
Romania international rugby union players
CSA Steaua București (rugby union) players
People of the Romanian Revolution
Deaths by firearm in Romania